Kung Fu Kid is a 1987 Sega Master video game.

Kung Fu Kid may also refer to:


Films
 The Kung Fu Kid (1977 film), a 1971 film with Nora Miao
 Kung Fu Kid (1994 film), also known as Shaolin Heroes, a Hong Kong chopsocky film
 The Kung Fu Kid (1995 film), a Hong Kong film produced by Golden Harvest
 Kung Fu Kid (2007 film), a 2007 film with Shinji Takeda
 The Kung Fu Kid, the working title of the 2010 film The Karate Kid
 Shaolin Kung Fu Kids, a 1995 film with Roger Kwok
 Super Kung Fu Kid, a 1974 Hong Kong film with Yuen Wah
 Young Dragons: Kung Fu Kids, a 1987 Taiwanese film directed by Kevin Chu

Television
 Kung Fu Kids, a Filipino television series
 The Kung-fu Kids, a Taiwanese television series directed by Kevin Chu

Other
 Zak Bucia, American mixed martial artist nicknamed "The Kung Fu Kid"
 Young Foo - The Kung Fu Kid, a storyline from the British comic book Cracker

See also 
 Karate Kid (disambiguation)